Ihuarulam Uche (born 19 June 1996) is a Nigerian professional footballer who plays as a forward for Nigerian Professional Football League club Sunshine Stars F.C.

Club career

In Nigeria
Ihuarulam started his professional career at Bayelsa United F.C. He played two seasons, before moving to Lobi Stars in July 2014. Uche joined Abia Warriors in 2015.

In Egypt
Three years at Abia Warriors, on 1 January 2018, Uche joined Egyptian club El Dakhleya on one-year contract.

Ghazl El Mahalla
In July 2018, Uche joined Egyptian Premier League club Ghazl El Mahalla.

Ifeanyi Ubah FC
Ihuarulam penned a one-year deal with Ifeanyi Ubah F.C. from El Mahalla in February 2019.

Sunshine
After a successful spell with Ifeanyi Ubah F.C., Ihuarulam joined Sunshine Stars F.C. in 2020.

References

External links
 

1996 births
Living people
Nigerian footballers
Association football forwards
Nigerian expatriate footballers
Expatriate footballers in Egypt
El Dakhleya SC players
Ghazl El Mahalla SC players
Nigerian expatriate sportspeople in Egypt
Egyptian Premier League players
Ifeanyi Ubah F.C. players
Sunshine Stars F.C. players
Nigeria Professional Football League players
Abia Warriors F.C. players